Melanie M. Valerio (born May 7, 1969) is an American former competition swimmer and Olympic gold medalist.

Valerio was born in Campbell, Ohio and graduated from the Hawken School in Gates Mills, Ohio.  Afterward, she attended the University of Virginia in Charlottesville, Virginia, where she swam for the Virginia Cavaliers swimming and diving team.

At the 1996 Summer Olympics in Atlanta, Georgia, Valerio earned a gold medal by swimming for the winning U.S. team in the preliminary heats of the women's 4×100-meter freestyle relay.

Valerio races Ironman and is an elite age-group member of the Timex Multisport Team.  She often blogs her races and training for Timex..

See also
 List of Olympic medalists in swimming (women)
 List of University of Virginia people

References

1969 births
Living people
American female freestyle swimmers
Olympic gold medalists for the United States in swimming
Sportspeople from Cleveland
Swimmers at the 1996 Summer Olympics
Virginia Cavaliers women's swimmers
Medalists at the 1996 Summer Olympics
People from Campbell, Ohio
Hawken School alumni